John Nsaneh Bazia is a politician from Botem, Rivers State who represented Tai in the Rivers State House of Assembly from 1999 to 2007 and is also the 
Commissioner Of Special Duties  He is a member of the Rivers State People's Democratic Party.

As of December 2015, he is the Commissioner of Chieftaincy and Community Affairs.

See also
List of people from Rivers State
5th Rivers State House of Assembly

References

Living people
Members of the Rivers State House of Assembly
Rivers State Peoples Democratic Party politicians
Commissioners of ministries of Rivers State
Ogoni people
First Wike Executive Council
Year of birth missing (living people)